Show Time is a live album by saxophonist Arnett Cobb with guests appearances by Dizzy Gillespie and Jewel Brown which was recorded in Houston in 1987 and released on the Fantasy label the following year.

Reception

The AllMusic review by Scott Yanow stated "Tenor saxophonist Arnett Cobb's next-to-last recording was cut at a concert in Houston that was held to celebrate his 69th birthday. Cobb is in typically fine form. ... This CD is a mixed bag, not essential but generally quite interesting".

Track listing
 "Sweet Mama" (Dizzy Gillespie) – 7:19
 "The Nearness of You" (Hoagy Carmichael, Ned Washington) – 4:25
 "Just a Closer Walk with Thee" (Traditional) – 5:44
 "Kathy's Blues" (Arnett Cobb) – 3:22
 "This Bitter Earth" (Clyde Otis) – 5:03
 "Time After Time" (Jule Styne, Sammy Cahn) – 4:31
 "A Night in Tunisia" (Gillespie, Frank Paparelli) – 7:26
 "Jazz Heritage Boogie" (Sammy Price) – 3:04

Personnel
Arnett Cobb – tenor saxophone
Dizzy Gillespie – trumpet, vocals (tracks 1 & 7)
Jewel Brown – vocals (tracks 5 & 6)
Kenny Andrews (tracks 2–6), Paul English (tracks 1 & 7), Sammy Price (track 8) – piano
Clayton Dyess – guitar (tracks 1–7)
Derrick Lewis– bass
Mike Lefebvre (tracks 1, 7 & 8), Malcolm Pinson (tracks 2–6) – drums

References

Arnett Cobb live albums
1988 live albums
Fantasy Records live albums